Overland is a census-designated place (CDP) in Hamilton County, Nebraska, United States. The population was 153 at the 2010 census.

Geography
Overland is located at  (41.0813, -97.9787). 

Demographics

References

Census-designated places in Hamilton County, Nebraska
Census-designated places in Nebraska